During the 1933–34 English football season, Brentford competed in the Football League Second Division for the first time in the club's history. A strong run in the middle of the season saw the Bees hold the second promotion place throughout March 1934, before a slight drop in form led the club to a still-impressive 4th-place finish.

Season summary
In preparation for Brentford's first-ever Second Division season and after a loss of £932 on the previous season (equivalent to £ in ), manager Harry Curtis brought in a number of younger players to replace ageing full backs Tom Adamson, Alexander Stevenson and half back captain Jimmy Bain. Curtis stuck with the same free-scoring strikeforce of the previous season, electing to add only outside left Charlie Fletcher from Clapton Orient. Despite winning just 6 of the opening 16 matches of the season, Brentford found themselves in 8th place, before a run of 8 wins in 11 matches put the club into the second promotion place on 3 February 1934. Manager Curtis had made an astute purchase in the transfer market in January, recruiting Southend United's full back Arthur Bateman as a replacement for Tom Adamson.

2nd place was held until a defeat to Bradford City on 24 March dropped Brentford back to 3rd and results in the following four matches dropped the club to 4th. A 2–0 win over Swansea Town on 14 April saw the Bees rise back to the one remaining promotion place, with just three matches to play. Defeat to Millwall in the first of those matches dropped Brentford back to 4th, but a resounding 5–0 victory over Lincoln City in the penultimate match of the season left the Bees knowing that a draw and favourable results for 2nd-place Preston North End and 3rd-place Bolton Wanderers on the final day would be enough to secure promotion to the First Division. Despite Brentford's 2–1 victory over Bury at Gigg Lane on the final day, victory for Preston North End saw the Lilywhites pip Bolton Wanderers into the second promotion place. Brentford finished 4th in the club's first season in the second tier of English football.

Just one of Brentford's 85 goals during the season came from a player who was not a forward, centre half Joe James and the tally of 8 goalscorers for the season was at that time the lowest in club history. Jack Holliday top-scored with an impressive 27 goals and Idris Hopkins flourished at the higher level, scoring 21 times. Ernest Muttitt, Billy Scott and Charlie Fletcher ably supported Holliday and Hopkins by also scoring in double-figures.

League table

Results
Brentford's goal tally listed first.

Legend

Football League Second Division

FA Cup

 Sources: Statto, 11v11, 100 Years of Brentford

Playing squad 
Players' ages are as of the opening day of the 1933–34 season.

 Sources: 100 Years of Brentford, Timeless Bees, Football League Players' Records 1888 to 1939

Coaching staff

Statistics

Appearances and goals

Players listed in italics left the club mid-season.
Source: 100 Years of Brentford

Goalscorers 

Players listed in italics left the club mid-season.
Source: 100 Years of Brentford

Amateur international caps

Management

Summary

Transfers & loans 
Cricketers are not included in this list.

References 

Brentford F.C. seasons
Brentford